Tibbermore is a small village situated about  west of Perth, Scotland. The parish extends to Aberuthven. 

Previously known as Tippermuir, it was the site of the Battle of Tippermuir in 1644, between the Marquis of Montrose's army and an army of Covenanters.

The church building, dating from 1632 and enlarged in 1789 is in a poor state of repair. Restoration was being considered in 2007. The church building is now only used occasionally for weddings and funerals.

Tibbermore has several listed buildings.

Notable people

Robert Rintoul (1787–1858), reformer, journalist, & founder of The Spectator.

References 

Villages in Perth and Kinross